Tímea Babos and Kristina Mladenovic were the defending champions, but chose not to participate together. Babos played alongside Yaroslava Shvedova, but lost in the quarterfinals to Irina-Camelia Begu and Monica Niculescu. Mladenovic teamed up with Caroline Garcia, but lost in the quarterfinals to Andrea Hlaváčková and Lucie Hradecká.
Martina Hingis and Sania Mirza won the title, defeating Ekaterina Makarova and Elena Vesnina in the final, 6–1, 6–7(5–7), [10–3].

Seeds
The top four seeds received a bye into the second round.

Draw

Finals

Top half

Bottom half

References
 Main Draw

Italian Open - Doubles
Women's Doubles